The piping bellbird (Ornorectes cristatus), or crested pitohui, is a species of bird in the family Oreoicidae. It was previously placed in the family Pachycephalidae.

It is found on New Guinea.
Its natural habitat is subtropical or tropical moist lowland forest.

References

piping bellbird
piping bellbird
Birds of New Guinea
Birds of Papua New Guinea
Birds of Western New Guinea
piping bellbird
piping bellbird
Taxonomy articles created by Polbot
Endemic fauna of New Guinea